Tjoflot is a village in the municipality of Ullensvang in Norway's Hardanger district, in Vestland county.

Tjoflot lies next  to the sea on the Oksen Peninsula, with Hardanger Fjord in front of the village to the southwest and Mount Oksen rising behind it. The village obtained a road connection in 1984.

The origin of the village name Tjoflot, as the toponym is written today, is uncertain. Descendants from Ytrabødn (also known as Garen or Erlingsgarden), the main farm in the settlement, usually write their surname as Tjoflot or Tjoflaat.

Genealogical records show that the toponym was previously spelled Þiodaflar in 1378, Thiodhaflar in 1427, Tiodaaflaa in 1463, Tyofflo in 1521, and Thioflodt in 1667. The locals say that Tjod (or Þjod) means 'people' and that the name originates from the location of an old assembly site at a level area where such an assembly could be held.

Notable people
Notable people that were born or lived in Tjoflot include:
Nils Tjoflot (1865–1898), violinist

References

Ullensvang
Villages in Vestland